William Huntington Kirkpatrick (October 2, 1885 – November 28, 1970) was a United States representative from Pennsylvania and a United States district judge of the United States District Court for the Eastern District of Pennsylvania.

Education and career
Born the son of William Sebring Kirkpatrick in Easton, Northampton County, Pennsylvania, Kirkpatrick attended the public schools, then received an Artium Baccalaureus degree from Lafayette College in 1905 and attended the University of Pennsylvania Law School. He was admitted to the bar and entered private practice of law in Easton starting in 1908. He served in World War I as major and lieutenant colonel, judge advocate, and was a member of the board of review of courts-martial in the United States Army.

Congressional service
Kirkpatrick was elected as a Republican to the United States House of Representatives of the 67th United States Congress, serving from March 4, 1921 until March 3, 1923. He was an unsuccessful candidate for reelection to the 68th United States Congress in 1922. He resumed private practice in Easton from 1923 to 1927.

Federal judicial service
Kirkpatrick was nominated by President Calvin Coolidge on March 3, 1927, to the United States District Court for the Eastern District of Pennsylvania, to a new seat created by 44  Stat. 1347. He was confirmed by the United States Senate on March 3, 1927, and received his commission the same day. He served as Chief Judge from 1948 to 1958. He assumed senior status on May 1, 1958. He was the last federal judge in active service to have been appointed to his position by President Coolidge. His service was terminated on November 28, 1970, due to his death in Cumberstone, an unincorporated community in Anne Arundel County, Maryland. Interment was in Christ Church Cemetery in West River, Maryland.

Notable cases
Kirkpatrick is remembered as "one of the unsung heroes of American corporate and securities law," issuing early but influential decisions in Insurance Shares Corp. v. Northern Fiscal Corp., which described circumstances in which a corporation's controlling shareholder has a fiduciary duty not to sell the control block to a looter, and Kardon v. National Gypsum Co., first recognizing an implied private cause of action for Rule 10b-5 violations.

Other service
Kirkpatrick was a trustee to Lafayette College from 1933 to 1961.

Notes

References

External links

The Political Graveyard

1885 births
1970 deaths
Pennsylvania lawyers
Judges of the United States District Court for the Eastern District of Pennsylvania
United States district court judges appointed by Calvin Coolidge
20th-century American judges
United States Army personnel of World War I
Lafayette College alumni
Lafayette College trustees
University of Pennsylvania Law School alumni
Republican Party members of the United States House of Representatives from Pennsylvania
Politicians from Easton, Pennsylvania